Schuler, also Schüler, Shuler, and Shuhler, is a surname. The German word Schüler directly translates to the English word scholar and can also mean "pupil". Notable people with the surname include:
 Anthony Joseph Schuler, American Roman Catholic bishop
 Charles Peter Schuler, American businessman and politician
 Diane Schuler, American motorist responsible for the 2009 Taconic State Parkway crash
 Else Lasker-Schüler, (1869–1945), German Jewish poet and playwright
 Franz Schuler (born 1962), Austrian biathlete
 Hans Schuler, American sculptor
 Heath Shuler, American football player and politician
 Jacob Schueler, German-American businessman
 James Shuler, American boxer
 Jim Shuler, American politician from Virginia
 Johannes Schüler (1894–1966), German conductor
 Markus Schuler, German association football player
 Max Schuler, German engineer, first described the Schuler tuning
 Mickey Shuler, American football player, New York Jets, Philadelphia Eagles
 Mickey Shuler, Jr., American football player, Penn State University
 Mike Schuler, American basketball coach
 Phillip Schuler (1893–1917), Australian journalist
 Raymond T. Schuler, commissioner of the New York State Department of Transportation
 Robert P. Shuler, American preacher, politician and advocate of alcohol prohibition
 Ron Schuler, Canadian politician
 Théophile Schuler, French painter

See also 
 George Schueler House, a historic home in Sarasota, Florida
 Schiller (disambiguation)
 Schuler (disambiguation)
 Schuller
 Schuyler (name)

Jewish surnames
Occupational surnames